Ioannis Perris (October 10, 1916 - August 20, 2006) was a Catholic Archbishop of Naxos, Andros, Tinos and Mykonos from October 24, 1960 to April 29, 1993.

Biography
 
Ioannis Perris was born on October 10, 1916 in Greece. After receiving theological education he was ordained priest on March 23, 1940.

On October 24, 1960 Pope John XXIII appointed Ioannis Perris as Archbishop of Naxos, Andros, Tinos and Minos. On January 12, 1961 he was ordained bishop by the Bishop of Syros and Milos, Georgios Xenopoulos, in collaboration with the Athenian Archbishop Venediktos Printesis and the Bishop of the Apostolic Exarchat of Greece Hyakinthos Gad.

From 1961 to 1964, Perris participated in the I, II, III and IV sessions of the Second Vatican Council.

From 1961 to 1993 he was the apostolic administrator of the diocese of Chios.

He retired on April 29, 1993.

On August 20, 2006 Ioannis Perris passed away.

References

External links
 http://www.catholic-hierarchy.org/bishop/bperris.html

1916 births
2006 deaths
Greek Roman Catholic archbishops